is a Japanese photographer.

Exhibitions
2004: Les Rencontres d'Arles festival, France.

Awards

1996

Higashikawa Prize - New Photographer Prize (Higashikawa, Hokkaido)

2002

The 27th Kimura Ihei Award, Asahi Shimbun Publishing Co.

References

Japanese photographers
1963 births
Living people
Date of birth missing (living people)